The 2011 Oklahoma Sooners football team represented the University of Oklahoma in the 2011 NCAA Division I FBS football season, the 117th season of Sooner football. The team was led by two-time Walter Camp Coach of the Year Award winner, Bob Stoops, in his 13th season as head coach. They played their home games at Gaylord Family Oklahoma Memorial Stadium in Norman, Oklahoma. They were a charter member of the Big 12 Conference.

Conference play began with a win at home over the Missouri Tigers on September 24, and concluded with a loss in the annual Bedlam Series to the Oklahoma State Cowboys on December 3 in Stillwater, Oklahoma. This loss marked the first time OSU had beaten Oklahoma in nine years, the last time coming in 2002. The Sooners finished the regular season with a 9–3 record (6–3 record in the Big 12), finishing in a tie with Baylor for third place in the conference. They were invited to the Insight Bowl, where they defeated Iowa, 31–14.

Following the season, Ryan Broyles was selected in the 2nd round of the 2012 NFL Draft, Donald Stephenson and Jamell Fleming in the 3rd, Frank Alexander and Ronnell Lewis in the 4th, James Hanna in the 6th, and Travis Lewis in the 7th.  This total number of seven ties with the total following the 2009 season as the second-most Sooners selected in the NFL Draft in the 16 years of the Stoops era, placing behind the mark of 11 following the 2004 season.

Recruits

Schedule

Roster

On May 19, 2011, Austin Box, a linebacker finishing his junior year at Oklahoma, was found dead in his home. El Reno Police Chief Ken Brown said officers and medics responded to a call at a house in the town about 30 miles west of Oklahoma City at about 9:25 AM concerning an unresponsive male "with unknown medical issues." Brown identified the man as Box and said he first was taken to an El Reno hospital, then transferred by air ambulance to Mercy Hospital in Oklahoma City. Box died a short time later. Sophomore running back Jonathan Miller announced after the season opener against Tulsa that he intended to transfer from Oklahoma. Five days after Miller announced he would be transferring, junior running back Jermie Calhoun announced he would also transfer out. On October 24, sophomore Austin Haywood announced he would also be transferring from Oklahoma at the end of the semester.

Game summaries

Tulsa

Sources:

Florida State

Sources:

Missouri

Sources:

Ball State

Texas (Red River Rivalry)

Sources:

Kansas

Sources:

Texas Tech

Sources:

The Red Raiders' victory over the Sooners ended Oklahoma's 39-game home winning streak, which started in 2005 after a loss to TCU in the season opener. The game was the Sooners’ first Big 12 Conference loss at Owen Field since 2001 and only the third time the team had lost at home under Bob Stoops.

Kansas State

Sources:

Texas A&M

Sources:

Baylor

Sources:

Iowa State

Sources:

Oklahoma State (Bedlam Series)

    
    
    
    
    
    
    
    
    
    

The 106th Bedlam game drew the largest crowd to ever watch a Bedlam game in Stillwater, a total of 58,141 people. Coming into the game at #3 and #10, the two teams tied for the second highest average ranking (6.5) in series history, behind the 1984 matchup and tied with the 1987 game. OSU's #3 ranking was the highest it was ranked coming into the Bedlam game since 1984. This year, Oklahoma State was looking to beat Oklahoma for the first time since 2002, while also trying to win their first outright conference title since 1948 in the three-team Missouri Valley conference. Oklahoma, on the other hand, was trying to upset OSU for the third year in a row and get their ninth Bedlam win in a row, which would also get them a share of their 8th Big 12 title and their second in a row. This was only the 5th time in the 106-year history of the Bedlam Series that OSU was ranked higher than OU going into the game. The last time was the year before, when the #14 Sooners upset the #10 Cowboys in Stillwater.

The game started out great for Oklahoma State, and pretty much stayed that way. After three punts (two by Oklahoma and one by OSU), the Cowboys finally put it into the endzone. On the following drive, OU junior QB Landry Jones was intercepted in the OSU endzone by Oklahoma State defender Broderick Brown. The Cowboys brought it all the way to the Sooner 8-yard line but were forced to settle for a field goal. After two punts by each team, QB Jones fumbled the football at the Oklahoma State 19-yard line, and OSU DE Jamie Blatnick returned it to the Sooner 1-yard line. On the next play, sophomore RB Joseph Randle took it in for the score to make it 17–0, OSU. The second half ended at 24–3, Cowboys up by 21. The third quarter was even more lopsided than the first two. Oklahoma State scored 20 points to go into the fourth quarter up by a score of 44–3. The final score came with under 2:40 left in the game, when OU backup redshirt freshman QB Blake Bell scored on a meaningless 28-yard rushing TD.

Oklahoma QB Landry Jones' passer rating of 88 was his lowest since Oklahoma's loss to Nebraska in 2009 in his freshman season. His 250 yards was his second lowest of the season behind only his 199 yards against Florida State and his two interceptions were tied for the most of his season. Also, his 23-yard longest pass was his shortest longest pass in a game he started in his entire career. The final score of 44-10 was the most points Oklahoma State had scored and the largest margin of victory the Cowboys had had since the 1945 Bedlam game, when #6 Oklahoma State demolished unranked OU, 47–0. The win gave OSU their first Big 12 title.

Iowa (Insight Bowl)

Sources:
    
    
    
    
    
    
    

Bob Stoops and assistant coach Bruce Kittle played for Iowa in a 1979 game against the Sooners.

Rankings

Statistics

Team

Scores by quarter

2012 NFL Draft

The 2012 NFL Draft was held on April 26–28, 2012 at Radio City Music Hall in New York City. The following Oklahoma players were either selected or signed as undrafted free agents following the draft.

References

External links
 

Oklahoma
Oklahoma Sooners football seasons
Guaranteed Rate Bowl champion seasons
Oklahoma Sooners football